Il Prezzo dell'onore is a 1953 Italian melodrama film directed by Ferdinando Baldi.

Cast
 Maria Frau as Maria
 Mario Vitale as Antonio
 Vincenzo Musolino as Francesco
 Mino Doro as Don Nicola
 Armando Guarnieri as Michele
 Amedeo Trilli as Minutolo
 Giovanna Ralli

External links
 

1953 films
1950s Italian-language films
Films directed by Ferdinando Baldi
Italian drama films
Melodrama films
1952 drama films
Italian black-and-white films
1950s Italian films